Jason Gonzalez (born February 28, 1990 in Torrance, California) is a Nicaraguan-American professional mixed martial artist who formerly competed in the lightweight division of the Ultimate Fighting Championship.

Mixed martial arts career

Early career
Gonzalez began his professional MMA career in 2011. Fighting mainly in his native California, Gonzalez amassed a record of 10 wins against 2 losses over the first five years of his career.

The Ultimate Fighter
In 2015 Gonzalez was selected as one of the fighters on The Ultimate Fighter: Team McGregor vs. Team Faber as a member of Team Faber. In the opening round he faced Tim Welch and won via TKO in the second round. In the first elimination round he faced Abner Lloveras and lost the bout by unanimous decision.

Ultimate Fighting Championship
Gonzalez made his official UFC debut at UFC 203 on September 10, 2016. He faced Drew Dober and lost the bout via knockout in the first round.

In his second fight for the promotion, Gonzalez faced J.C. Cottrell at UFC on Fox: Shevchenko vs. Peña on January 28, 2017. He won via a D'arce choke submission in the first round to earn his first UFC win.

In his third fight for the promotion, Gonzalez faced Gregor Gillespie on September 16, 2017 at UFC Fight Night 116. He lost the back-and-forth fight via submission in the second round. Despite the loss, Gonzalez was awarded his first Fight of the Night bonus award.

Gonzalez faced Jim Miller on April 27, 2019 at UFC Fight Night: Jacaré vs. Hermansson. He lost the fight via a rear-naked choke submission in the first round.

Gonzalez was released by UFC in December 2019.

Championships and accomplishments
Ultimate Fighting Championship
Fight of the Night (One time)

Mixed martial arts record

|-
|Loss
|align=center|11–5
|Jim Miller
|Submission (rear-naked choke)
|UFC Fight Night: Jacaré vs. Hermansson 
|
|align=center|1
|align=center|2:12
|Sunrise, Florida, United States
|
|-
|Loss
|align=center|11–4
|Gregor Gillespie
|Submission (arm-triangle choke)
|UFC Fight Night: Rockhold vs. Branch 
|
|align=center|2
|align=center|2:11
|Pittsburgh, Pennsylvania, United States
|
|-
|Win
|align=center|11–3
|J.C. Cottrell
|Submission (D'arce choke)
|UFC on Fox: Shevchenko vs. Peña 
|
|align=center|1
|align=center|3:54
|Denver, Colorado, United States
|
|-
|Loss
|align=center|10–3
|Drew Dober
|KO (punches)
|UFC 203  
|
|align=center|1
|align=center|1:45
|Cleveland, Ohio, United States
|
|-
|Win
|align=center|10–2
|Chris Padilla
|TKO (punches)
|RFA 38: Moisés vs. Emmers 
|
|align=center|3
|align=center|5:00
|Costa Mesa, California, United States
|
|-
|Win
|align=center|9–2
|Jessie Glass
|Submission (rear-naked choke)
|Gladiator Challenge: California State Championship Series
|
|align=center|1
|align=center|1:36
|San Jacinto, California, United States
|
|-
|Win
|align=center|8–2
|Chad McEwen
|KO (punch)
|Gladiator Challenge: Holiday Beatings
|
|align=center|1
|align=center|0:50
|El Cajon, California, United States
|
|-
|Win
|align=center|7–2
|Jake Albinio
|Submission (triangle choke)
|Gladiator Challenge: Season's Beatings
|
|align=center|1
|align=center|2:21
|Rancho Mirage, California, United States
|   
|-
|Win
|align=center|6–2
|Chad McEwen
|Submission (armbar)
|Gladiator Challenge: Glove Up
|
|align=center|1
|align=center|2:38
|San Jacinto, California, United States
|
|-
|Win
|align=center| 5–2
|Shane Johnson
| Submission (triangle choke)
|WFC 10: Fury of Heat
|
|align=center|1
|align=center|2:17
|Laughlin, Nevada, United States
|
|-
|Loss
|align=center| 4–2
|Dionisio Ramirez
|KO 
|Xplode Fight Series: Summer Fight Night 3
|
|align=center| 1
|align=center| 1:42
|Twentynine Palms, California, United States
| 
|-
|Win
|align=center| 4–1
|Christos Giagos
|Submission (D'arce choke)
|Respect in the Cage
|
|align=center| 2
|align=center| 4:14
|Pomona, California, United States
|
|-
|Loss
|align=center| 3–1
|Shane Lees
|Submission (armbar)
|CWC: Operation Fight Night
|
|align=center| 1
|align=center| 3:33
|Fort Hood, Texas, United States
|
|-
| Win
|align=center| 3–0
|Dominic Clark
|KO (punch)
|Respect in the Cage
|
|align=center|2
|align=center|0:28
|Pomona, California, United States
|
|-
| Win
|align=center| 2–0
|Kerry Lattimer
|Submission (rear-naked choke)
|Xtreme Warfare: Inauguration
|
|align=center|1
|align=center|3:47
|Layton, Utah, United States
|
|-
| Win
|align=center| 1–0
|Chris Camacho
|TKO (doctor stoppage)
|KOTC: Next Generation
|
|align=center|3
|align=center|0:33
|Highland, California, United States
|
|-

References

External links
 
 

1990 births
Living people
American male mixed martial artists
People from Torrance, California
Mixed martial artists from California
American people of Nicaraguan descent
Lightweight mixed martial artists
Ultimate Fighting Championship male fighters